Toko Yasuda is a Japanese singer, songwriter, keyboardist, guitarist, and bassist, best known as a member of New York indie rock band Enon and as a musician in live St. Vincent performances.

Life and career
Yasuda grew up in the cities of Fujisawa and Kamakura. Her father was once a dōshu of Aikido. She moved to New York City in 1992, and lived there until 2006.

Yasuda has played in the bands The Lapse and The Van Pelt before their disbandment, and had a brief stint in Blonde Redhead. After that Toko appeared in the band Enon from 1999 to 2007.

Yasuda plays bass guitar, electronic keyboards, electric guitar and sings. Welsh singer/songwriter Cate le Bon noted "She has the voice of a beautiful, icy ghost; it might be the spookiest thing I've ever heard." 

Yasuda currently resides in Los Angeles and formerly she shortly lived in Philadelphia, after being priced out of both Manhattan and Brooklyn. The New York Times profiled Enon's move to Philadelphia as indication of a greater phenomenon of transplanted New Yorkers to the "sixth borough".

In 2012, Yasuda released the album Parthenon under the pseudonym Plvs Vltra. Parthenon is Yasuda's first solo album, featuring collaborations with Danny Ray Thompson of the Sun Ra Arkestra, Scott Allen of Thunderbirds Are Now, and John Schmersal, also of Enon, who produced the album. Mike Reid from the music webzine Tiny Mix Tapes described the album as "a straight-up pop album with alluring (because “sexy” sounds misogynist and creepy) female vocals".
She has released her latest Ambient album Institute  under the pseudonym Kotokoto in 2018.

Yasuda is featured on Cate le Bon's Album Mug Museum (vocals), and on the song "Masseduction" on St.Vincent's 2017 fifth studio album Masseduction which won the award for Best Recording Package and Best Rock Song for its title track, and was also nominated for the Best Alternative Music Album. She also appeared on the track "Gimme A Chance" on Azealia Banks' 2014 debut album Broke With Expensive Taste which was sampled from a song "Knock That Door" on the album Lost Marbles & Exploded Evidence from the band Enon in 2005.

Yasuda toured with St. Vincent through the Strange Mercy Tour (2011-12), the Digital Witness Tour (2014-15) - (supporting the album  St. Vincent), and through the "I Am A Lot Like You" tour (2018-19) - (supporting the album Masseduction). She provided electric bass, keyboards, guitar and backing vocals. In 2019, she was brought in as a touring keyboardist for Sleater-Kinney to perform songs from the band's new album The Center Won't Hold. In february 2022 she plays bass guitar in Cate le Bon's Pompeii US and Europe tour.

Discography

 Parthenon (2012) (as PLVS VLTRA)
 Yo-Yo Blue (2013) (as PLVS VLTRA)
 Rooftop Arcade/Mesopotamia (2013) (as PLVS VLTRA)
 Institute (2018) (as Kotokoto)

References

External links
https://abandonedlivingroom.com/review/kotokoto-institute/
https://soundcloud.com/plvs-vltra
https://soundcloud.com/user-828711725
PlvsVltra Bandcamp
Enon official website
Touch & Go/Quarterstick Records official website

Japanese electronic musicians
Living people
Year of birth missing (living people)
Musicians from Kanagawa Prefecture
Japanese emigrants to the United States
Japanese women in electronic music
Women bass guitarists
Japanese bass guitarists
Japanese keyboardists
People from Fujisawa, Kanagawa